AHEC may refer to:
 Tilen Ahec, a Slovenian soccer player who played for 2016–17 NK Aluminij season

 Area Health Education Center, a center in the U.S. federal government program Area Health Education Centers Program
 Army Heritage and Education Center, Carlisle Barracks, Pennsylvania

 Auraria Higher Education Center, Denver, Colorado, USA; a learning center on the Auraria Campus
 Australian Health Ethics Committee, a medical ethics ethics committee

See also

 
 HEC (disambiguation)